The Romanian International, also known as BanuInvest International Championships, is an international badminton open held in Romania since 1991. It was halted in 1994, 1996, 1997, and between 2001 and 2005. The tournament belongs to the EBU Circuit.

Previous winners

Sources
InternationalBadminton.org: 2007 results
InternationalBadminton.org: 2006 results

References

External links
Official Site

Badminton tournaments
Badminton in Romania
International sports competitions hosted by Romania
Recurring sporting events established in 1991